'''Memories Don't Die''' (stylized in all caps) is the second studio album by Canadian rapper Tory Lanez. It was released on March 2, 2018 through Mad Love Records and Interscope Records. The production on the album was handled by multiple producers including OG Parker, Smash David, Play Picasso, AraabMuzik, Cashmere Cat, Happy Perez and C-Sick among others. The album also features guest appearances by Future, Nav, 50 Cent, Wiz Khalifa and Fabolous among others.

Memories Don't Die was supported by four singles: "Shooters", "Skrt Skrt" ,"Real Thing" and "Hypnotized". The album received generally mixed reviews from music critics but was a commercial success. The album debuted at number three on the US Billboard 200 chart, earning 54,000 album-equivalent units in its first week.

Background and promotion
On June 14, 2017, Tory Lanez confirmed that his second album was "90% completed" via a tweet on Twitter.

The album's completion was announced by Lanez on August 2, 2017. On October 5, 2017, Lanez announced his second album's title.

On August 11, 2017, Lanez was featured in an interview with HotNewHipHop about his album's theme, by stating

On February 9, 2018, Lanez unveiled the album's cover art and tracklist.

On January 1, 2017, Lanez released two mixtapes: Chixtape IV and The New Toronto 2 which were promoted as the prelude for his second album.

Singles
Memories Don't Die was supported by four singles. The album's lead single, "Shooters" was released for streaming and digital download on September 22, 2017. A month later, the music video was released online. The single missed the Hot 100 but managed to peak at number 19 on the US Bubbling Under the Hot 100 chart. The song also peaked at number 68 on the Canadian Hot 100 chart. The album's second single, "Skrt Skrt" was released on September 28, 2017. The song also peaked at number 96 on the Canadian Hot 100 chart. The album's third single, "Real Thing" featuring Future was released on October 13, 2017. The song peaked at number 71 on the Canadian Hot 100 chart.

Promotional singles
The first promotional single, "I Sip" was released on November 16, 2017, shortly after premiering on Zane Lowe's Beats 1 radio. The song peaked at number 79 on the Canadian Hot 100 chart. The second promotional single, "B.I.D" was released on February 15, 2018, following the same roll-out as the former. The single missed the Hot 100 but managed to peak at number four on the US Bubbling Under the Hot 100 chart. The song also peaked at number 46 on the Canadian Hot 100 chart and number 85 on the UK Singles Chart respectively.

Other songs
On February 9, 2018, three tracks that were cut from the album – "March 2nd", "More Than Friends" and "Leaning", the latter two both featuring PartyNextDoor, was released by Lanez for his fans.

Critical reception

Memories Don't Die received mixed reviews from critics. At Metacritic, which assigns a normalized rating out of 100 to reviews from mainstream critics, Memories Don't Die received an average score of 46 based on five reviews, indicating "mixed or average reviews". Kassandra Guagliardi of Exclaim! concluded that the album has "a few quality tracks, but overall it misses the mark on classic appeal." In a scathing negative review, Ben Beaumont-Thomas of The Guardian described the album as an "astonishingly hackneyed, aggressively chameleonic LP", while comparing the album to the work of Lanez's contemporaries: "As Migos or 2 Chainz ably demonstrate, rapping about racks and whips isn’t necessarily dull, but you need to have wit, nimble hooks and idiosyncratic flow, none of which Lanez possesses. He’s so profoundly unoriginal you start to wonder if he is actually a rudimentary Spotify AI project who has been fed the RapCaviar playlist and given an edgy beard. But Lanez ultimately doesn’t pass the Turing test, and his jack-of-all-trades versatility leaves him the master of none."

Sheldon Pearce of Pitchfork commented that Memories Don't Die is "a record full of crude imitations of every remotely bankable contemporary R&B or rap song", criticising the originality of the album: "Nearly everything he raps on Memories Don’t Die is something you’ve heard before, performed more ably elsewhere, and the few lines that aren’t are unbelievably simple-minded or straight-up witless."

Commercial performance
In his home country of Canada, Memories Don't Die debuted at number one on the Canadian Albums Chart, earning 8,000 album-equivalent units in its first week. This became Tory Lanez's first number one debut in Canada. In the United States, Memories Don't Die debuted at number three on the US Billboard 200 chart, earning 54,000 album-equivalent units (including 15,000 copies as pure album sales) in its first week of release. This became Tory Lanez's second US top-ten debut on the chart. The album also accumulated a total of 54 million on-demand audio streams for the set’s tracks that week. In its second week, the album dropped to number 16 on the chart, earning an additional 23,000 units.

Track listing
Credits adapted from the album's liner notes and Tidal.

Notes
  signifies a co-producer
 "Memories" and "Don't Die" are stylized in uppercase letters. For example, "Memories" is stylized as "MEMORIES".
 "Hypnotized" features background vocals by Kennedi Lykken

Sample credits
 "Skrt Skrt" contains interpolations from "Dat Sexy Body", written by Karen Chin and Anthony Kelly.
 "Benevolent" contains excerpts from "Sounds Like a Love Song", written by Douglas Gibbs and Ralph Johnson, as performed by Bobby Glenn.
 "Hate to Say" contains excerpts and a sample from "You & I", written by Julian Bunetta, John Ryan and Jamie Scott, as performed by One Direction.
 "Pieces" contains portions and a sample from "Shape of My Heart", written by Gordon Sumner and Dominic Miller, as performed by Sting.

Personnel
Credits adapted from the album's liner notes and Tidal.

Musicians
 Daniel Gonzalez – instrumentation , programming 
 Daystar Peterson – instrumentation , programming 
 Carl Caruso – instrumentation , programming 
 Charles Dumazer – instrumentation , programming 
 Happy Perez – instrumentation , programming , guitar 
 Mansa Evans – instrumentation , programming 
 Dr. Zeuz – instrumentation 
 Wallace Jefferson – instrumentation 
 Christian Lou – instrumentation , programming 
 BobbyMadeTheBeat – instrumentation , programming 
 Sebastian Rompotis – instrumentation , programming 
 Smash David – instrumentation , programming 
 OG Parker – instrumentation , programming 
 Edgar Ferrera – instrumentation , programming 
 Larry Cooper, Jr. – instrumentation , programming 
 Sergio Romero – instrumentation , programming 
 Nick Fouryn – instrumentation , programming 
 Benny Blanco – instrumentation , programming , keyboards 
 Cashmere Cat – instrumentation , programming , keyboards 
 Sean Myer – instrumentation , programming , keyboards 
 Danny Morris – instrumentation , programming 
 Abraham Orellana – instrumentation , programming 

Technical
 Johann Chavez – mixing , engineering 
 Daniel Gonzalez – mixing , engineering 
 Raymond Martinez – engineering assistance 
 Lucas "Lowkis" Rompotis – mixing assistance , engineering assistant 
 Chris Gehringer – mastering 
 Will Quinnell – mastering 
 Jordan "Trouble" Bacchus – engineering 
 David Schwerkolt – engineering assistance 
 Mark "Spike" Stent – mixing 
 Michael Freeman – mixing assistance 
 Geoff Swan – mixing assistance 

Production
 Andrew Luftman – production coordination 
 Seif Hussain – production coordination 
 Astrid Taylor – production coordination 
 Sarah Shelton – production coordination 
 Sascha Stone Guttfreund – production coordination 
 Philip Payne – production coordination 
 Troy Dubrowsky – production coordination 
 Raymond Martinez – production coordination 
 Soffia Yen – production coordination 

Additional personnel
 Troy Dubrowsky – coordinator
 Joshua "Mid Jordan" Farias – creative director

Charts

Weekly charts

Year-end charts

References

2018 albums
Tory Lanez albums
Interscope Records albums
Albums produced by C-Sick
Albums produced by Happy Perez
Albums produced by Benny Blanco
Albums produced by Cashmere Cat
Albums produced by AraabMuzik
Albums produced by OG Parker